The following Confederate States Army units and commanders fought in the Second Battle of Ream's Station on August 25, 1864. The Union order of battle is listed separately.

Abbreviations used

Military rank
 Gen = General
 LTG = Lieutenant General
 MG = Major General
 BG = Brigadier General
 Col = Colonel
 Ltc = Lieutenant Colonel
 Maj = Major

Other
 (w) = wounded
 (mw) = mortally wounded
 (k) = killed in action
 (c) = captured

Army of Northern Virginia

Third Corps

LTG A. P. Hill

Cavalry Corps

MG Wade Hampton

Sources
 Venter, Bruce M. "Hancock the (Not So) Superb: The Second Battle of Reams' Station, August 25, 1864", in Blue & Gray, Volume XXIII, issue 5 (Winter 2007). ISSN 0741-2207.

American Civil War orders of battle